Isak Dahlqvist (born 25 September 2001) is a Swedish footballer who plays for Superettan club Örgryte IS as a midfielder. He is the younger brother of fellow footballers Hampus Dahlqvist and Edvin Dahlqvist.

References

External links 
 

2001 births
Living people
Swedish footballers
Sweden youth international footballers
Allsvenskan players
Superettan players
IFK Göteborg players
Örgryte IS players
Association football midfielders